Winchelsea railway station is located on the Warrnambool line in Victoria, Australia. It serves the town of Winchelsea, and it opened on 25 November 1876.

The station opened as the temporary terminus of the line from Geelong. On 13 March 1877, the line was extended to Birregurra.

In July 2008, the loop siding was removed, leaving the station straight-railed.

Platforms and services

Winchelsea has one platform. It is serviced by V/Line Warrnambool line services.

Platform 1:
 services to Warrnambool and Southern Cross

References

External links
Victorian Railway Stations gallery

Railway stations in Australia opened in 1876
Regional railway stations in Victoria (Australia)
Surf Coast Shire